Robert Mose Patrick Daudlin (born 3 March 1940) is a Canadian lawyer who was a Liberal party member of the House of Commons of Canada.

Born in Port Crewe, Ontario, He won the Kent—Essex electoral district in the 1974 federal election and was re-elected in the 1979 and 1980 federal elections. He did not campaign in the 1984 election, thus he left office after serving in the 30th, 31st and 32nd Canadian Parliaments.

He was appointed a judge of the Ontario Court of Justice in 1990.

External links
 

1940 births
Living people
Members of the House of Commons of Canada from Ontario
Liberal Party of Canada MPs